Yohan: The Child Wanderer is a 2010 family film directed by Grete Salomonsen. The film is based on true stories about child wanderers in Norway.

The film was made simultaneously in two languages, English and Norwegian. It was scheduled to be distributed to 30 countries. It premiered in Norway on March 26, 2010. As of August 2011, it still has not been released in the United States.
Yohan is the most expensive children's film ever made in Norway. The film features 100 specific roles, 400 to 500 extras and around 200 animals.
Yohan was filmed in Norway and also California, US in order to shoot scenes with wolves. These scenes were directed by Hollywood animal trainer Steve Martin.

Production
Penelopefilm in Kristiansand, Norway started to work on the film in 1990, researching historical facts regarding the child wanderings. In 1991, the company interviewed two remaining child wanderers, living in the United States. They were then 99 and 100 years old.

Cast

Music
The film's theme song is performed by Carola Häggkvist.

References

External links
 Official site
 
 

Films directed by Grete Salomonsen
2010s Norwegian-language films
Norwegian children's films
Films based on actual events